The women's 67 kg  competition in taekwondo at the 2000 Summer Olympics in Sydney took place on September 29 at the State Sports Centre.

South Korea's Lee Sun-hee had added another gold medal to her sporting squad in the final match against Norway's Trude Gundersen with a score of 6–3. Japanese fighter Yoriko Okamoto booted her stretch to prevail a tight, 6–5 victory over 17-year-old British teen Sarah Stevenson for the bronze.

Competition format
The main bracket consisted of a single elimination tournament, culminating in the gold medal match. The taekwondo fighters eliminated in earlier rounds by the two finalists of the main bracket advanced directly to the repechage tournament. These matches determined the bronze medal winner for the event.

Schedule
All times are Greece Standard Time (UTC+2)

Competitors

Results
Legend
PTG — Won by points gap
SUP — Won by superiority
OT — Won on over time (Golden Point)
WO — Walkover

Main bracket

Repechage

References

External links
Official Report

Women's 067 kg
Olymp
Women's events at the 2000 Summer Olympics